Les Corts is a neighborhood in the les Corts district of Barcelona, Catalonia (Spain).

It is the most central part of the district and was the main core of the old town of les Corts, or les Corts de Sarrià (added to Barcelona in 1897).

Corts, les
Corts, les